Scelotes insularis is a species of lizard which is endemic to Mozambique.

References

insularis
Reptiles of Mozambique
Reptiles described in 1990
Taxa named by Donald George Broadley